BRUSH SEM is a manufacturer of large generators for  gas turbine and steam turbine drive applications, based at Plzeň in the Czech Republic.

The site for BRUSH SEM was established in 1859, by Count Wallenstein-Vartenberk who set up a branch of his foundry and engineering works in Plzeň approximately 100 km south west of Prague in the Czech Republic.

In 1869, the plant was taken over by Emil Škoda,  an industrious engineer and dynamic entrepreneur who was quick to expand the business. In the 1880s, Škoda established what was then a very modern steelworks capable of delivering castings weighing dozens of tons.  Steel castings and, later, forgings for larger passenger liners and warships went on to rank alongside the sugar mills as the top export branches of Škoda's factory.

In 1899, the ever-expanding business was transformed into a joint-stock company, and before the First World War the Škoda Works became the largest arms manufacturer in Austria-Hungary. It was a main contractor to the army and navy supplying mainly heavy guns and ammunition. The First World War brought a drop in the output of peacetime products but  huge sums were invested into expanding production capacities for military products.

By that time, Škoda Works had acquired a number of companies in the Czech Lands and abroad that were not involved in arms manufacture. In 1917, the company had 35,000 employees in Plzeň.

With the emergence of the Czechoslovakia in 1918, and the complex economic conditions of post-war Europe the company was transformed from what was exclusively an arms manufacturer into a multi-sector concern. In addition to traditional branches, the production programme embraced a number of new concepts, such as steam (and later electric) locomotives. aircraft, ships, machine tools, steam turbines, power-engineering equipment, etc.

In 1924, the Škoda works manufactured their first turbogenerator with an output of 14MW and their first hydro generator in 1926.

The deteriorating political situation in Europe saw arms production rise again in the mid-thirties. The Second World War and the company's forced integration into the German weapons programme led to serious damage at the Works themselves (70% of the company complex was destroyed by Allied bombing in April 1945) and the loss of several foreign markets.

In 1945, the company was nationalized. Škoda Works was gradually split up into different sections (e.g. the car works in Mladá Boleslav, the aircraft plant in Prague, factories in Slovakia, and other plants producing food-industry equipment). The company's main task now was to produce equipment for heavy engineering, capital construction in the industrial sector, public transportation, and power engineering. Most exports were headed towards the Eastern Bloc.

In 1989 Czechoslovakia broke away from communism and Soviet control and the country was separated into the Czech Republic and Slovakia. Until this transition period the Škoda  Elektrické Stroje works primarily manufactured generators and electrical control equipment products for the eastern European and Soviet markets.

Following the change in political climate in 1989, Škoda started along the path of privatization, and used this time to come up with an optimal production programme, and look for markets other than those co-ordinated through the Council of Mutual Economic Assistance (CMEA or COMECON), which operated a Centralised Planning System (CPS).  The factory followed instructions and manufacture products that were not subjected to the constraints of the western business model of commercial tendering.

After 1989, the Škoda Elektrické Stroje works retained their design technology and manufacturing capability, and attempted to compete and sell their products on the world markets. However, with little international commercial experience and very few orders the business rapidly fell into financial difficulties and the plant was under the threat of closure. In March 2001, FKI plc purchased Škoda Elektrické Stroje from the main Škoda group and following the acquisition was renamed BRUSH SEM. Melrose plc acquired FKI plc in 2008 including BRUSH SEM. The Company currently the site employs approximately 950 staff, 465 of which are direct production personnel.

To date the BRUSH SEM works have manufactured over 1400 turbo generators and 250 hydro generators to many parts of the world including USA, Canada, Russia, China, India, Middle East, Central&East Europe, West Europe, Australia, Africa and South America.

External links
BRUSH SEM website
BRUSH website

Plzeň